Sicut Judaeis (Latin: "As the Jews") were papal bulls which set out the official position of the papacy regarding the treatment of Jews. The first bull by that name was issued in about 1120 by Calixtus II and served as a papal charter of protection to Jews. It was prompted by attacks on Jews by the First Crusade, during which over five thousand Jews were slaughtered in Europe. The bull forbade Christians, on pain of excommunication, from forcing Jews to convert, harming them, taking their property, disturbing the celebration of their festivals and interfering with their cemeteries.

Following further attacks, further bulls by many popes reaffirmed the doctrine, including Alexander III, Celestine III (1191–1198), Innocent III (1199), Honorius III (1216), Gregory IX (1235), Innocent IV (1246), Alexander IV (1255), Urban IV (1262), Gregory X (1272, 1274), Nicholas III, Martin IV (1281), Honorius IV (1285–1287), Nicholas IV (1288–1292), Clement VI (1348), Urban V (1365), Boniface IX (1389), Martin V (1422), and Nicholas V (1447).

Church attitude to treatment of Jews 
The Church's stated attitude against the mistreatment of Jews goes back to the early Church. Around 400, St Augustine, one of the most influential and foundational figures of Catholic theology, preached that the Jews must be protected for their ability to explain the Old Testament.

The words  ("As the Jews") were first used by Pope Gregory I (590-604) in a letter addressed to the Bishop of Naples. Around 598, in reaction to anti-Jewish attacks by Christians in Palermo, Pope Gregory brought Augustine's teachings into Roman Law. He published a bull which became the foundation of Catholic doctrine in relation to the Jews and specified that, although the Jews had not accepted salvation through Christ, and were therefore condemned by God until such time as they accept salvation, Christians were nevertheless duty-bound to protect the Jews as an important part of Christian civilization. The Pope emphasized that Jews were entitled to "enjoy their lawful liberty." The Bull said that Jews should be treated equitably and justly, that their property rights should be protected, and that they should keep their own festivals and religious practices.

In 1065, Pope Alexander II wrote to Béranger, Viscount of Narbonne, and to Guifred, bishop of the city, praising them for having prevented the massacre of the Jews in their district, and reminding them that God does not approve of the shedding of blood. In 1065 also, Alexander admonished Landulf VI of Benevento "that the conversion of Jews is not to be obtained by force."

Despite the position expressed in the Sicut Judaeis, the Church imposed restrictions on Jews. For example, the Fourth Lateran Council in 1215 decreed that Jews be differentiated from others by their type of clothing to avoid marriage between Jews and Christians. Jews were sometimes required to wear a yellow badge or a pointed hat. 

The imposition of exorbitant taxes on Jews was widespread, and practice of expelling Jews, usually after stripping them of their property through taxation, was also widespread. For example, in 1229, King Henry III of England forced Jews to pay half the value of their property in taxes, which was followed by further taxation and then by the expulsion of Jews from England in 1290. Jews were also expelled from France, Spain, and Portugal.

Extracts from the bull

Pope Alexander III (1159-1181) is the author of the oldest extant version of the bull. Excerpts from a translation of the bull follow:

"[The Jews] ought to suffer no prejudice.  We, out of the meekness of Christian piety, and in keeping in the footprints of Our predecessors of happy memory, the Roman Pontiffs Calixtus, Eugene, Alexander, Clement, admit their petition, and We grant them the buckler of Our protection.

For We make the law that no Christian compel them, unwilling or refusing, by violence to come to baptism.  But, if any one of them should spontaneously, and for the sake of the faith, fly to the Christians, once his choice has become evident, let him be made a Christian without any calumny.  Indeed, he is not considered to possess the true faith of Christianity who is not recognized to have come to Christian baptism, not spontaneously, but unwillingly.

Too, no Christian ought to presume...to injure their persons, or with violence to take their property, or to change the good customs which they have had until now in whatever region they inhabit.

Besides, in the celebration of their own festivities, no one ought disturb them in any way, with clubs or stones, nor ought any one try to require from them or to extort from them services they do not owe, except for those they have been accustomed from times past to perform.

...We decree... that no one ought to dare mutilate or diminish a Jewish cemetery, nor, in order to get money, to exhume bodies once they have been buried.

If anyone, however, shall attempt, the tenor of this decree once known, to go against it...let him be punished by the vengeance of excommunication, unless he correct his presumption by making equivalent satisfaction."

References

Catholicism and Judaism
12th-century papal bulls
Documents of Pope Callixtus II
History of the Jews in Europe